Lawrence R. Larsen (March 23, 1897 – March 2, 1965) was a member of the Wisconsin State Assembly.

Larsen was born to Danish immigrants in Racine, Wisconsin. During World War I, he served in the United States Army. He died on March 2, 1965, after emergency heart surgery for a ruptured artery.

Political career
Larsen was a member of the Assembly in 1951 and 1953. Additionally, he was Chief Clerk of the Wisconsin State Senate from 1935 to 1945 and again from 1955 until his death.

References

Politicians from Racine, Wisconsin
American people of Danish descent
Members of the Wisconsin State Assembly
Military personnel from Wisconsin
United States Army soldiers
United States Army personnel of World War I
1897 births
1965 deaths
20th-century American politicians